The ring-imaging Cherenkov, or RICH, detector is a device for identifying the type of an electrically charged subatomic particle of known momentum, that traverses a transparent refractive medium, by measurement of the presence and characteristics of the Cherenkov radiation emitted during that traversal. RICH detectors were first developed in the 1980s and are used in high energy elementary particle- , nuclear- and astro-physics experiments.

This article outlines the origins and principles of the RICH detector, with brief examples of its different forms in modern physics experiments.

Ring-imaging Cherenkov (RICH) detector

Origins 

The ring-imaging detection technique was first proposed by Jacques Séguinot and Tom Ypsilantis, working at CERN in 1977. Their research and development, of high precision single-photon detectors and related optics, lay the foundations for the design development  and construction of the first large-scale Particle Physics RICH detectors, at CERN's OMEGA facility and LEP (Large Electron–Positron Collider) DELPHI experiment.

Principles 
A ring-imaging Cherenkov (RICH) detector allows the identification of electrically charged subatomic particle types through the detection of the Cherenkov radiation  emitted (as photons) by the particle in traversing a medium with refractive index   > 1.  The identification is achieved by measurement of the angle of emission, of the Cherenkov radiation, which is related to the charged particle's velocity  by

where  is the speed of light.

A typical (simulated) distribution of  vs momentum of the source particle, for single Cherenkov photons, produced in a gaseous radiator (n~1.0005, angular resolution~0.6mrad) is shown in the following figure:

The different particle types follow distinct contours of constant mass, smeared by the effective angular resolution of the RICH detector; at higher momenta each particle emits a number of Cherenkov photons which, taken together, give a more precise measure of the average  than does a single photon, allowing effective particle separation to extend beyond 100 GeV in this example.
This particle identification is essential for the detailed understanding of the intrinsic physics of the structure and interactions of elementary particles.  The essence of the ring-imaging method is to devise an optical system with single-photon detectors, that can isolate the Cherenkov photons that each particle emits, to form a single "ring image" from which an accurate  can be determined.

A polar plot of the Cherenkov angles of photons associated with a 22 GeV/c particle in a radiator with =1.0005 is shown below; both pion and kaon are illustrated; protons are below Cherenkov threshold,
,
producing no radiation in this case (which would also be a very clear signal of particle type = proton, since fluctuations in the number of photons follow Poisson statistics about the expected mean, so that the probability of e.g. a 22 GeV/c kaon producing zero photons when ~12 were expected is very small; e−12 or 1 in 162755) The number of detected photons shown for each particle type is, for illustration purposes, the average for that type in a RICH having  ~ 25 (see below).

Note that, because the points of emission of the photons can be at any place on the (normally straight line) trajectory of the particle through the radiator, the emerging photons fill a light-cone in space.

In a RICH detector the photons within this light-cone pass through an optical system and impinge upon a position sensitive photon detector. With a suitably focusing optical system this allows reconstruction of a ring, similar to that above, the radius of which gives a measure of the Cherenkov emission angle . The resolving power of this method is illustrated by comparing the Cherenkov angle per photon, see the first plot above, with the mean Cherenkov angle per  particle (averaged over all photons emitted by that particle) obtained by ring-imaging, shown below; the greatly enhanced separation between particle types is very clear:

This ability of a RICH system to successfully resolve different hypotheses for the particle type depends on two principal factors, which in turn depend upon the listed sub-factors;

 The effective angular resolution per photon, 
 Chromatic dispersion in the radiator ( varies with photon frequency)
 Aberrations in the optical system
 Position resolution of the photon detector
 The maximum number of detected photons in the ring-image, 
 The length of radiator through which the particle travels
 Photon transmission through the radiator material
 Photon transmission through the optical system
 Quantum efficiency of the photon detectors
 is a measure of the intrinsic optical precision of the RICH detector.  is a measure of the optical response of the RICH; it can be thought of as the limiting case of the number of actually detected photons produced by a particle whose velocity approaches that of light, averaged over all relevant particle trajectories in the RICH detector.   The average number of Cherenkov photons detected, for a slower particle, of charge  (normally ±1), emitting photons at angle  is then

and the precision with which the mean Cherenkov angle can be determined with these photons is approximately
 

Given the known momentum of the emitting particle and the refractive index of the radiator, the expected Cherenkov angle for each particle type can be predicted, and its difference from the observed mean Cherenkov angle calculated.  Dividing this difference by   then gives a measure of the 'number of sigma' deviation of the hypothesis from the observation, which can be used in computing a probability or likelihood for each possible hypothesis.  The following figure shows the 'number of sigma' deviation of the kaon hypothesis from a true pion ring image (π not k) and of the pion hypothesis from a true kaon ring image (k not π), as a function of momentum, for a RICH with  = 1.0005,  = 25,  = 0.64 milliradians;

Also shown are the average number of detected photons from pions(Ngπ) or from kaons(Ngk). One can see that the RICH's ability to separate the two particle types exceeds 4-sigma everywhere between threshold and 80 GeV/c, finally dropping below 3-sigma at about 100 GeV.  It is important to note that this result is for an 'ideal' detector, with homogeneous acceptance and efficiency, normal error distributions and zero background.  No such detector exists, of course, and in a real experiment much more sophisticated procedures are actually used to account for those effects; position dependent acceptance and efficiency; non-Gaussian error distributions; non negligible and variable event-dependent backgrounds.

In practice, for the multi-particle final states produced in a typical collider experiment, separation of kaons from other final state hadrons, mainly pions, is the most important purpose of the RICH.  In that context the two most vital RICH functions, which maximise signal and minimise combinatorial backgrounds, are its ability to correctly identify a kaon as a kaon and its ability not to misidentify a pion as a kaon. The related probabilities, which are the usual measures of signal detection and background rejection in real data,  are plotted below to show their variation with momentum (simulation with 10% random background);

Note that the ~30% π → k misidentification rate at 100 GeV is, for the most part, due to the presence of 10% background hits (faking photons) in the simulated detector; the 3-sigma separation in the mean Cherenkov angle (shown in the 4th plot above) would, by itself, only account for about 6% misidentification. More detailed analyses of the above type, for operational RICH detectors, can be found in the published literature.

For example, the LHCb experiment at the CERN LHC studies, amongst other B-meson decays, the particular process B0 → π+π−. The following figure shows, on the left, the π+π− mass distribution without RICH identification, where all particles are assumed to be π ; the B0 → π+π− signal of interest is the turquoise-dotted line and is completely swamped by background due to B and  Λ decays involving kaons and protons, and combinatorial background from particles not associated with the B0 decay.

On the right are the same data with RICH identification used to select only pions and reject kaons and protons; the B0 → π+π− signal is preserved but all kaon- and proton-related backgrounds are greatly reduced, so that the overall B0 signal/background has improved by a factor ~ 6, allowing much more precise measurement of the decay process.

RICH Types 

Both focusing and proximity-focusing detectors are in use. In a focusing RICH detector, the photons are collected by a spherical mirror with focal length  and focused onto the photon detector placed at the focal plane. The result is a circle with a radius , independent of the emission point along the particle's track. This scheme is suitable for low refractive index radiators (i.e., gases) with their larger radiator length needed to create enough photons.

In the more compact proximity-focusing design a thin radiator volume emits a cone of Cherenkov light which traverses a small distance, the proximity gap, and is detected on the photon detector plane. The image is a ring of light the radius of which is defined by the Cherenkov emission angle and the proximity gap. The ring thickness is mainly determined by the thickness of the radiator. An example of a proximity gap RICH detector is the High Momentum Particle Identification (HMPID), one of the detectors of ALICE (A Large Ion Collider Experiment), which is one of the five experiments at the LHC (Large Hadron Collider) at CERN.

In a DIRC (Detection of Internally Reflected Cherenkov light), another design of a RICH detector, light that is captured by total internal reflection inside the solid radiator reaches the light sensors at the detector perimeter, the precise rectangular cross section of the radiator preserving the angular information of the Cherenkov light cone. One example is the DIRC of the BaBar experiment at SLAC.

The LHCb experiment on the Large Hadron Collider uses two RICH detectors for differentiating between pions and kaons. The first (RICH-1) is located immediately after the Vertex Locator (VELO) around the interaction point and is optimised for low-momentum particles and the second (RICH-2) is located after the magnet and particle-tracker layers and optimised for higher-momentum particles.

The Alpha Magnetic Spectrometer device AMS-02, recently mounted on the International Space Station uses a RICH detector in combination with other devices to analyze cosmic rays.

References 

Particle detectors